Stuart MacLeod is a Scottish-born professional magician, television producer, writer, comedian, and television personality. He is best known for Magic for Humans on Netflix, The Magicians and working in Scottish BAFTA-nominated duo Barry and Stuart. Stuart was also a judge representing Scotland on CBS's The World's Best.

Early life
Stuart MacLeod was born in the town of Peterhead in Aberdeenshire, Scotland. He attended Peterhead Academy and then studied philosophy and psychology at Aberdeen University. He took an interest in magic and magicians early in his life. In 1995 and 1996, Stuart Macleod was twice awarded "Young Magician of the Year" in Scotland.

Barry and Stuart duo

Stuart MacLeod and Barry Jones first met at a club for magicians in Aberdeen in 1994-1995. They began as rivals and their contest reached its culmination at the Scottish Young Magician of the Year competition where Stuart and Barry both won main awards. In 2002, MacLeod and Jones teamed up to form the magic duo Barry and Stuart.Soon they began making videos of magic on the streets. The duo was noticed by television production company Objective Productions which resulted in their first TV series Magick. Later, the show was nominated as Best Comedy Series at the Rose d'Or. Eventually, the duo became popular and MacLeod and Jones went on to make TV series and specials including Dirty Tricks, The Magic of Jesus, Tricks from the Bible, The Magicians and The Happenings (the latter was broadcast internationally on the National Geographic Channel). Their live theater shows include Part Time Warlocks (first performed at Edinburgh Festival Fringe), Powered by Demons (Edinburgh Festival Fringe and Soho Theatre, London)., Barry and Stuart: Live and more.

Solo career

Since 2013, MacLeod successfully pursued solo endeavors in television and cinematography while still performing as a magician both solo and in collaboration with other illusionists. In 2013, MacLeod served as a consulting producer for The incredible Mr. Goodwin: Dangerman (5 episodes) In 2015, he co-wrote (with Jenni Melear and Adrian Elizondo) and directed Funny Love, a silent short film which premiered at the Dances With Films festival in Hollywood. In 2016, MacLeod performed in the T.V. series The Next Great Magician, where illusionists competed against each other for the title of Next Great Magician. In 2017, MacLeod was executive producer of James Galea's Best Trick Ever (TV Series). He is co-executive producer of the Netflix series Magic for Humans, an American reality television show featuring magician Justin Willman performing tricks on the street He also performed in live magic shows including Band of Magicians (Las Vegas) and The Illusionists, Live from Broadway. In 2018, Macleod featured among other famous Scots who have moved to Hollywood as part of a comedy documentary Gary Goes to Hollywood which was broadcast on BBC Scotland on December 31, 2018. In 2019, MacLeod was on a panel of 50 experts from the entertainment industry (representing Scotland) in The World's Best show, a reality talent competition television series hosted by James Corden with judges Drew Barrymore, Faith Hill, and Rupaul.

Personal life
Stuart MacLeod married actress Jenni Melear in 2014. They live and work in Los Angeles.

References

External links

Stuart MacLeod on IMDb

1980 births
Living people
Scottish magicians
Scottish television producers